Bothriopupa tenuidens is a species of gastropod belonging to the family Vertiginidae.

The species is found in Central America.

References

Vertiginidae
Gastropods described in 1845